Wilkinson is an unincorporated community in Logan County, West Virginia, United States. Wilkinson has a post office with ZIP code 25653.

The community was named after Judge Wilkinson, the original owner of the town site.

References

Unincorporated communities in Logan County, West Virginia
Unincorporated communities in West Virginia
Coal towns in West Virginia